The Monument to the Victims of the USS Maine (Spanish: Monumento a las víctimas del Maine) was built in 1925 on the Malecón boulevard at the end of Línea Calle, in the Vedado neighborhood of Havana, Cuba.

History

The American battleship Maine exploded in the Havana harbor on February 15, 1898, killing two officers and 250 sailors. Fourteen of the survivors eventually died of their injuries, bringing the death toll to a total 266. A board of inquiry concluded that the explosion was caused by a mine placed outside the ship, and the release of the board’s report led many to accuse Spain of sabotaging the ship, this helped to build public support for the Spanish–American War. Later studies published in 1976, reissued in 1995, concluded that the ship was destroyed from the inside.

The ship had anchored in Havana harbour for three weeks previously at the request of American Consul Fitzhugh Lee.

Monument
Fifteen years after the explosion of the USS Maine in 1913, President of the Cuban Republic Mario García Menocal erected a monument on the Malecón in honor of the victims. The architect Félix Cabarrocas oversaw the construction which began in 1924 and ended in 1925 under the tenure of President Alfredo Zayas. On the day of its inauguration, 8 March 1925, Cuban and American personalities attended the celebration including President Zayas and American General John Pershing. At the base of the monument were placed two cannons and a remaining part of the ship's anchor chain that had been salvaged in 1911. In addition, two 40-foot tall Ionic columns were erected; originally the columns did not hold an eagle. Subsequently, they were crowned with a bronze eagle with open wings, created by Cabarrocas. A bronze plaque reads:"To the Victims of the USS Maine. The people of Cuba".

The eagle with its wings extended vertically in such a way that a hurricane in October 1926 damaged the monument.  The original eagle was replaced in 1926 by one with horizontal wings. The first one is now in the U.S. Embassy in Havana.

President busts
There were originally three busts of Americans: President William McKinley, who declared war on Spain; Leonard Wood, first military governor in Cuba, and President Theodore Roosevelt. On July 4, 1943, a fourth bust was added—that of Andrew Summers Rowan, the army officer who was said to have carried a message to General Calixto Garcia just prior to the start of the Spanish-American War.

Partial destruction
On 18 January 1961, the eagle and busts of the Americans were removed, because it was considered a "symbol of imperialism," The following inscription was later added by the Communist government:

To the victims of the Maine who were sacrificed by the imperialist voracity and their desire to gain control of the island of CubaFebruary 1898 – February 1961
(A las víctimas de El Maine que fueron sacrificadas por la voracidad imperialista en su afán de apoderarse de la isla de Cuba.Febrero 1898 – Febrero 1961)

"The eagle was torn down after the triumph of the revolution because it's the symbol of imperialism, the United States, and the revolution ended all that," said Ernesto Moreno, a 77-year-old Havana resident who remembers waking up one day and seeing the statue gone. "I found it to be a very good thing, and I think most Cubans agreed at the time."

Monument restoration
The eagle's head was later given to Swiss diplomats. It, too, is now in the building of the Embassy of the United States, Havana. The body and the wings are stored in the Havana City History Museum. The museum's curator believes that good relations with the U.S. will be symbolized by the reunification of the parts of the eagle. Parts of the monument including the original eagle are today being restored.

Gallery

Other USS Maine monuments
Other monuments to USS Maine are located in the U.S. including: Central Park in New York City; Wood-Ridge, NJ; Key West; Arlington National Cemetery; and Annapolis. (See USS Maine: Memorials)

See also

Spanish–American War
USS Maine (1889)
Barrio de San Lázaro, Havana
Hotel Nacional de Cuba
FOCSA Building
Cuban Grand Prix
Malecón, Havana

Notes

References

External links 
 
 Hartshorn, Byron, "Visiting the USS Maine around Washington, DC"
 United States Navy, Bureau of Steam Engineering, Specifications for triple-expansion twin-screw propelling machinery for U.S.S. Maine at Google Books. Retrieved 6 April 2012.
 From spanamwar.com:
 Background information on the Maine
 Theories on the loss of the Maine
 Official 1898 Court of Inquiry Report
 How Likely was a Coal Bunker Fire Aboard the Battleship Maine?
 USS Maine Pictures from the Library of Congress American Memory website
  – Construction – Active Service
 USS Maine from NARA
 Google Books:
  Black, William F. "The Story of the Maine" in Proceedings of the Municipal Engineers of the City of New York

to the Victims of the USS Maine (Havana)
Memorial, Havana Feb. 2012 HD

Monuments and memorials in Cuba
USS Maine (1889)
Spanish–American War memorials
Buildings and structures in Havana
Tourist attractions in Havana
1889 ships
Armored cruisers of the United States Navy
Battleships of the United States Navy
Conspiracy theories in the United States
Cuba–United States relations
History of Key West, Florida
International maritime incidents
Maritime incidents in 1898
Ships sunk by non-combat internal explosions
Ship fires
Ships built in Brooklyn
Shipwrecks in the Gulf of Mexico
Spanish–American War
Naval magazine explosions
1898 fires in North America
Vandalized works of art